Margaret Dorothy Louise Daniels  (1 August 1916 – 27 June 1981) was a New Zealand ballet teacher and director.

Early years
She was born in Wellington, New Zealand, on 1 August 1916, the third of four children of Winifred Louise Smart and her husband, Frederick William Daniels, a civil servant. She was educated at Kelburn Normal School and Wellington Girls' College. At the age of 15, she opened her first studio at King's Chambers, at the corner of Willeston and Willis Streets.

Marriage
On 21 December 1938, aged 22, she wed Desmond Hulbert Bezzant; the couple had one child.

Later years
In 1965, she took up a Teacher's Award from the Queen Elizabeth II Arts Council of New Zealand to observe ballet teaching methods in the United Kingdom and Europe, including Russia, where she studied the Bolshoi Ballet. In the 1976 New Year Honours, she was appointed a Member of the Order of the British Empire, for services to ballet.

References

External links
 Dorothy Daniels Academy of Dancing, natlib.govt.nz; accessed 23 June 2015.
 Ballets Russes in Australia tour to New Zealand, nla.gov.au; accessed 23 June 2015.

1916 births
1981 deaths
New Zealand ballerinas
People from Wellington City
New Zealand Members of the Order of the British Empire
20th-century New Zealand dancers
20th-century New Zealand educators
People educated at Wellington Girls' College